Atakent is a town in Mersin Province, Turkey.

Geography 

Atakent is a Mediterranean coastal town in  Silifke district which itself is a part of Mersin Province. Alluvial plains of Silifke lie in the west of the town and hilly coastline is in the east of the town. The town is on the D 400 highway. The settled population is 6049 as of 2012.

History 
The ruins of the historical town of Korasion which had been founded by Flavius Uranius, the governor of Roman Province Isauria between 367−375, is on the north east of the town. The ruins of Hellenistic and Roman settlement Karakabaklı are to the north. The new town is actually formed by a merger of four Turkmen villages in 1987. Now the former villages are quarters of the town.
Susanoğlu quarter is at the east and Kapızlı quarter is at the west.

Economy 

The main activity in Atakent with wide sandy beaches is tourism. Boarding houses and campings as well as newer hotels and clubs attract domestic tourists. Agriculture, especially forced crop agriculture is also an important activity. Fruits, like strawberries are well known products of Atakent.

References 

Populated places in Mersin Province
Populated coastal places in Turkey
Towns in Turkey
Tourist attractions in Mersin Province
Populated places in Silifke District